Mitti Na Pharol Jogiya (2015) is a Punjabi film based on a true story of 1947 Partition of India and showcases Indo-Pak harmony.

Production
It is directed by Avtar Singh, Starring Kartar Chemma, Aman Grewal, Japtej Singh in lead roles. Movie Produced under banner Ram Avtar Art Film.

Cast
 Japtej Singh as Jagga
 Amann Grewal as 
 Lakha Lakhwinder Singh as Lakha
 Kartar Cheema as Sucha Singh
 Rupinder Rupi
 Sanju Solanki 
 Razia Sukhbir 
 Damanpreet
 Navdeep Kaler

References

External links
Official Movie Facebook page

2015 comedy films
Indian comedy films
Films set in India
Films shot in India
2015 films
Punjabi-language Indian films
Punjabi-language Pakistani films
2010s Punjabi-language films